This is a list of Danish football transfers for the 2021–22 winter transfer window. Only transfers featuring Danish Superliga are listed.

Danish Superliga

Note: Flags indicate national team as has been defined under FIFA eligibility rules. Players may hold more than one non-FIFA nationality.

Brøndby

In:

Out:

Midtjylland

In:

Out:

Copenhagen

In:

Out:

AGF

In:

Out:

Nordsjælland

In:

Out:

Randers

In:

Out:

AaB

In:

Out:

SønderjyskE

In:

Out:

OB

In:

Out:

Vejle

In:

Out:

Viborg

In:

Out:

Silkeborg

In:

Out:

See also
 2021–22 Danish Superliga

References

External links
 Official site of the DBU
 Official site of the Danish Superliga

Denmark
Transfers
2021-22